Holly Robinson is a fictional character appearing in American comic books published by DC Comics, commonly in association with the superhero Batman. Holly Robinson is a frequent ally and sidekick of Catwoman. She was trained by Wildcat and her friend Selina Kyle, and temporarily became the new Catwoman following the birth of Selina's daughter.

In 2004, the Catwoman comic won a GLAAD Media Award for its positive portrayal of Holly as an openly gay character.

Publication history
Holly Robinson first appeared in Batman #404 during Frank Miller's Batman: Year One story arc where she was created by Frank Miller and David Mazzucchelli.

Fictional character biography

Year One
Holly first appeared in Batman: Year One as a juvenile prostitute who lives with Selina Kyle. Holly plays a small but significant role in the story when she encounters a disguised Bruce Wayne during one of his early attempts at crimefighting and stabs him in the leg. Wounded by this attack and a subsequent battle, Wayne escapes back to his home, brooding on the fact that his enemies do not fear him. This encounter is an impetus for his creation of the Batman persona. As such, Holly plays an indirect role in the Dark Knight's origin.

Holly also appeared in the 1989 Catwoman mini-series by Mindy Newell and J.J Birch (collected in trade paperback as Catwoman: Her Sister's Keeper), which retold Catwoman's origin based on Miller's take on the character in Batman: Year One. In this story, Catwoman leaves Holly at a convent where Selina's sister Maggie is a nun.

Death and return
In 1988 Holly appeared in "The Tin Roof Club", from Action Comics Weekly #611–614. In this story, she has married a successful businessman who is actually a mobster. Her new husband has Holly killed off in his quest to reclaim a valuable piece of jewelry that Catwoman stole from one of his safehouses. Unable to link Holly's death to her husband in order for him to be arrested for the crime, Catwoman kills two corrupt security guards in his employment and frames Holly's husband for their murders.

Holly's death was ultimately overturned years later, when writer Ed Brubaker ignored this storyline in order to incorporate Holly into the cast of the 2002 Catwoman series. Brubaker admitted in an interview that he had not been aware of Holly's death until after he had reintroduced the character. He addressed this issue in Catwoman Secret Files and Origins #1 with a two-page story titled "Why Holly Isn't Dead", in which the fourth wall is broken as Holly contemplates her own resurrection. It is implied that the Action Comics Weekly story was erased from continuity as a result of Zero Hour.

As established by Brubaker, Holly had run away from a bad home as a child, ending up on the streets. She and Selina had met when Selina rescued Holly from a cop who was trying to extort her. When Selina became Catwoman, she left Holly behind. Holly had joined Selina's sister, Maggie, at her convent. She never felt entirely a part of that world, and a few years afterwards she left the convent with Maggie. After she and Maggie lost track of each other, Holly became addicted to drugs and returned to the streets. In this revision of Holly's history, the events of "The Tin Roof Club" never occurred.

Catwoman (volume 3)
Holly reappeared in Catwoman (vol. 3) #1. After a series of brutal murders of working girls, Holly returns to the apartment that she and Selina had shared in "Year One", and finding that Selina has returned, is happily reunited with her friend.

Holly cleans up her act and becomes a sidekick of sorts to Catwoman. She pretends to be part of the street life when in actuality, she is working as Selina's eyes and ears, ferreting out what is happening on the streets of the East End. While on the job, Holly is troubled by the fact that she still views the world from the mindset of a junkie, even though she managed to quit drugs several months before reuniting with Selina. It is also revealed that Holly is a lesbian.

In the "Relentless" story arc, Black Mask attempts to destroy Catwoman's life with the help of Sylvia, a childhood friend of Selina's who has a grudge against her. Holly is reunited with her friend Maggie Kyle, but Maggie is kidnapped and tormented by Black Mask. Holly is also beaten and kidnapped, and eventually Holly kills Sylvia to save Selina's life. Holly is severely traumatized by these events and isolates herself for a time. She steals some of Maggie's painkillers, but does not take any of the drugs, and heals to some degree when she reconnects with Selina.

Selina decides that Holly needs some time away from Gotham to heal after the events of "Relentless", and the two embark on a road trip in Catwoman (vol. 3) #20–24 (collected in trade paperback as Catwoman: Wild Ride). Selina arranges for Holly to be trained by  Ted Grant (Wildcat). They then travel through several cities before ending up in St. Roch, where it is revealed that Selina and Slam Bradley have located her brother Davey. She finds him working at a bar and learns that he had also run away, and had traveled around the world.

Later in the series, Holly becomes a den mother to a group of street kids known as the Alleytown Gang, who act as informants for Catwoman.

The new Catwoman

After the events of Infinite Crisis, DC Comics jumped forward in time. In the "One Year Later" storyline, Holly Robinson has taken over as the new Catwoman at the request of Selina Kyle, who has decided to retire from the role after becoming pregnant.

In Catwoman (vol. 3) #53, Holly Robinson makes her first appearance as Catwoman; at the close of the issue she is ambushed by the Angle Man. Although Holly escapes, she is caught on film administering a brutal beating to Angle Man. Reluctant to ask Selina for help, Holly turns instead to Ted Grant.

Holly is arrested and takes the blame for the murder of Black Mask (Selina had actually committed the crime). She is rescued from jail by Selina and takes a short break from being Catwoman. While Selina is getting Holly's name erased from the police database, Holly again suits up as Catwoman to stop a new villainess named Blitzkrieg from executing a young girl on a live video-feed to the internet. Holly manages to save the girl, but not before she is unmasked on the live web feed.

After the rescue, Holly runs into Detective Lenahan, a Gotham cop who has become fixated on capturing Catwoman. They are confronted by Hammer and Sickle, who want Selina dead, and are perfectly willing to dispose of Holly in the meantime. Lenahan is killed by the Russian supervillains, but Selina arrives in time to save Holly. The police assume that Holly and Catwoman are responsible for Lenahan's death after finding the two women next to his corpse in Catwoman (vol. 3) #67.

Holly and Selina manage to escape from the GCPD and defeat Hammer and Sickle. Despite of it, Holly is now wanted for Lenahan's murder and her identity as Catwoman is public knowledge. She exits the series in Catwoman (vol. 3) #69 and begins a new life as a fugitive.

Countdown

Holly first appears in Countdown #47; she rescues an elderly homeless man, moving him away from debris falling from a destroyed building. Homeless herself and on the run for the murder of Black Mask, she is offered a place to stay by a mysterious woman wearing a stola or chiton who goes by the name Athena. Holly accepts the offer to stay at an Athenian Women's Shelter, which houses battered and abused women. One of the residents is a reformed Harley Quinn.

After some time at the women's shelter, it eventually becomes apparent that Athena, running the shelter, is in fact the nefarious Granny Goodness who takes to training these women - Holly and Harley among them - to be her new Female Furies. After they are brought to an island for training, Holly and Harley meet the Amazon queen Hippolyta, and encounter Mary Marvel. The group reveal Granny's deception. Holly, Harley and Mary follow Granny Goodness as she retreats to Apokolips. With Mary's help, the group manages to free the Greek gods, and Holly is granted the powers of Diana (Goddess of the Hunt) as a reward and displays both archery skills and feral, cat-like physical enhancements. After returning to Earth, Holly loses these powers. After witnessing the "Great Disaster" on Earth-51, she returns to Gotham City alongside Jason Todd and Harley, with whom she leaves at the end of the series.

In the first issue of the series Gotham City Sirens, it is mentioned that Holly no longer lives with Harley Quinn, and has decided to begin a new life elsewhere with money she received after helping Selina steal Tommy Elliot's fortune.

DC Rebirth
In 2016, DC Comics implemented another relaunch of its books called "DC Rebirth" which restored its continuity to a form much as it was prior to "The New 52". Holly is a former child prostitute who was trained in the martial arts by Selina as a way of keeping her safe. When a terrorist cell from Kahndaq bombs the orphanage Holly grew up in, she uses her training to hunt down and murder each member of the group. Holly ends up killing 237 terrorists, after which Selina chooses to take the fall for her crimes in order to protect her. Batman uncovers this, but Holly attacks him and manages to flee the country before he can take her into custody. She assumes the alias Catherine Ann Turley in this universe.

Skills, resources and abilities
Holly has no meta-abilities. She has been taught stealth,  athletics, hot-wiring, lock-picking, thieving, acrobatics, and martial arts by Selina. Ted Grant trained her in a form of kick-boxing adapted for street use, as well as English boxing. She has also spent time at a Female Furies training camp. She is proficient in the use of firearms, knives, and the whip. As of Countdown to Final Crisis #10, Holly had a portion of the cunning and skill of Diana, Goddess of the Hunt. While she possessed these powers, she was an excellent marksman, and had the ability to track people by their scent. She lost these powers after returning to Earth.

In other media

Film
 Holly Robinson appears in the 2011 direct-to-video animated film Batman: Year One, voiced by Liliana Mumy. A disguised Bruce Wayne encounters her as a prostitute on East End who draws Bruce into a battle with her pimp Stan.
 Holly Robinson appears in the 2011 direct-to-video animated short-film DC Showcase: Catwoman, voiced again by Liliana Mumy. Here, she is kidnapped by human slave traders while attempting to leave Gotham. Her tracking and eventual rescue by Catwoman is the plot of the film.
 Holly Robinson is mentioned by name in the anime-style film Catwoman: Hunted, where she is off-screen taking care of a group of girls who were rescued by Catwoman from Leviathan's human trafficking business.

Video games
 In an interview tape in Batman: Arkham City, Hugo Strange threatens to put Holly in Arkham City if Catwoman continues to try stealing from him, causing Catwoman to threaten killing Strange if he ever does something to Holly. Strange is forced to threaten Holly's life multiple times during other tapes when Selina acts defiantly. In the final tape, Hugo tells Catwoman Holly is safe and that he has no interest in Holly unless she lands herself in Arkham City.
 In one of Catwoman's introduction sequences in Injustice 2, she calls Harley Quinn her "new Holly Robinson". Quinn questions why they're fighting if that's the case, and Catwoman responds with: "This is how I trained Holly".

See also
 Homosexuality in the Batman franchise

References

Catwoman
DC Comics female superheroes
DC Comics LGBT superheroes
DC Comics martial artists
Fictional child prostitutes
Fictional lesbians
Fictional whip users
Comics characters introduced in 1987
Characters created by Frank Miller (comics)
Fictional drug addicts
Fictional female sex workers
GLAAD Media Award for Outstanding Comic Book winners